Genevieve Baildon (born 1985) is a New Zealand international lawn bowler.

Bowls career
In 2009, she won the Hong Kong International Bowls Classic singles.

She was selected to represent New Zealand at the 2010 Commonwealth Games, where she competed in the triples events.

Baildon won the gold medal in the fours with Jo Edwards, Leanne Curry and Jan Khan and the bronze medal in the triples at the 2011 Asia Pacific Bowls Championships in Adelaide.

References

1985 births
New Zealand female bowls players
Living people
Bowls players at the 2010 Commonwealth Games
Commonwealth Games competitors for New Zealand